The Lonely Skier is a 1947 thriller novel by the British writer Hammond Innes. It is set in the Dolomites where a number of people are hunting a stash of buried Nazi treasure. The hero Neil Blair, recently demobbed from the army and unemployed, is hired to go to an isolated ski resort and pretend he is writing a screenplay.

In 1948 it was adapted into a film Snowbound directed by David MacDonald for Gainsborough Pictures and starring Dennis Price, Robert Newton and Herbert Lom.

Jack Adrian relates how Innes completed an arduous skiing course in the Italian Dolomites just before he was demobbed. It was, said Innes, "Stiffer than any army course I was ever on, including battle training."  His experiences were used as the background for the novel.

References

Bibliography
 Goble, Alan. The Complete Index to Literary Sources in Film. Walter de Gruyter, 1999.

1947 British novels
Novels by Hammond Innes
British thriller novels
British novels adapted into films
William Collins, Sons books
Novels set in Italy